Parveen Azam Ali (born 4 April 1979) is a British nurse and radio presenter of Pakistani origin who works at the University of Sheffield. She is Professor in Nursing in the Faculty of Medicine, Dentistry and Health - Health Sciences School, Division of Nursing and Midwifery/Sheffield Teaching Hospitals/Doncaster and Bassetlaw Teaching Hospitals. She was an associate editor of Nursing Open until 2021, a contributor to The Conversation (website) and a presenter on LinkFM. She was a founding member of The Lancet Commission on Nursing. In 2020 she became the editor-in-chief of International Nursing Review the society journal of the International Council of Nurses.

Research
Ali's research covers health inequalities and ethnicity with a specific focus on domestic violence.

Honours and awards
In 2014 Ali was one of six recipients of the annual Mary Seacole awards from the Royal College of Nursing to fund her work to reduce inequality for black and minority ethnic communities. In 2017 Ali received an Emerging Nurse Researcher award from the European region of Sigma Theta Tau International. Ali is a Senior Fellow of the Higher Education Academy and a Fellow of the Royal Society of Arts. Ali's work as a radio presenter to the Pakistani community of South Yorkshire on health related issues was recognised in 2020 by the International Council of Nurses. In 2022 Ali won the Asian Women of Achievement Award in the Professions category.

Publications
Ali's 121 publications on Google Scholar have been cited over 1000 times giving her an h-index of 21, her most cited publications are:

References

External links

Entry on ORCID

Academics of the University of Sheffield
British nurses
Pakistani nurses
Nursing researchers
Living people
1979 births
Aga Khan University alumni